Henryków  is a village in the administrative district of Gmina Ziębice, within Ząbkowice Śląskie County, Lower Silesian Voivodeship, in south-western Poland.

The village has a population of 1,400.

The village contains the landmark Cistercian Monastery Complex. A Latin chronicle, the Book of Henryków, compiled at Henryków abbey in the 13th century contains the first known sentence written in the Polish language.

There is a train station in Henryków.

Gallery

Surroundings 
 Cistercian Monastery Complex in Henryków
 Gola Dzierżoniowska Castle
 Niemcza (medieval town)

References

Henrykow